Wake Up to Find Out is a three-CD live album by the rock band the Grateful Dead.  It contains the complete concert recorded on March 29, 1990, at Nassau Coliseum in Uniondale, New York.  It was released by Rhino Records on September 9, 2014.

At this concert, jazz saxophonist Branford Marsalis sat in for one song in the first set, and then for the entire second set.  The same show was also released on the same day as part of the box set Spring 1990 (The Other One).  One of the songs from this performance, "Eyes of the World", was previously released on the album Without a Net.

Wake Up to Find Out was released as a five-disc vinyl LP on April 18, 2015, as part of Record Store Day.

Concert with Branford Marsalis
The March 29, 1990 Grateful Dead concert was the first of several to feature Branford Marsalis as a guest musician.  In a 2014 interview with Rolling Stone, Marsalis recalled that Dead bassist Phil Lesh had invited him to play with the band for one song.

Band reaction

Critical reception

On AllMusic, Fred Thomas said, "After they whip through a bright first set featuring mostly live staples like 'Bertha' and 'Ramble on Rose', Marsalis joins in at the start of the second set for stellar, extended takes on the more exploratory side of the Dead catalog. His airy improvisations on classics like 'Eyes of the World' and 'Dark Star' sound brilliantly natural here, and what's most palpable is the sense of exhilaration and mutual respect between these two forces of sonic trailblazing."

In Rolling Stone, David Fricke wrote, "In the spring of 1990, the Dead's last consistent season of transcendence onstage, there was no bolder display of their improvising empathy than this show at Long Island's Nassau Coliseum... An invitation to saxophonist Branford Marsalis to come jam resulted in legend, as Marsalis spent the whole second set in high, jazzy challenge and exchange with the band... In a history of hot nights, this was especially sweet fire."

Track listing
Disc 1
First set:
"Jack Straw" (Bob Weir, Robert Hunter) – 6:15
"Bertha" (Jerry Garcia, Hunter) – 6:59
"We Can Run" (Brent Mydland, John Barlow) – 6:04
"Ramble On Rose" (Garcia, Hunter) – 8:08
"When I Paint My Masterpiece" (Bob Dylan) – 6:02
"Bird Song" (Garcia, Hunter) – 13:05
"Promised Land" (Chuck Berry) – 4:46
Disc 2
Second set:
"Eyes of the World" (Garcia, Hunter) – 16:33
"Estimated Prophet" (Weir, Barlow) – 14:47
"Dark Star" (Garcia, Mickey Hart, Bill Kreutzmann, Phil Lesh, Ron McKernan, Weir, Hunter) – 18:19
"Drums" (Hart, Kreutzmann) – 10:22
Disc 3
"Space" (Garcia, Lesh, Weir) – 7:53
"Dark Star" (Garcia, Hart, Kreutzmann, Lesh, McKernan, Weir, Hunter) – 2:46
"The Wheel" (Garcia, Hunter, Kreutzmann) – 4:23
"Throwing Stones" (Weir, Barlow) – 9:25
"Turn On Your Lovelight" (Joseph Scott, Deadric Malone) – 7:41
Encore:
"Knockin' on Heaven's Door" (Dylan) – 8:24

Personnel
Grateful Dead
Jerry Garcia — lead guitar, vocals
Mickey Hart — drums
Bill Kreutzmann — drums
Phil Lesh — electric bass, vocals
Brent Mydland — keyboards, vocals
Bob Weir — rhythm guitar, vocals
Additional musicians
Branford Marsalis — saxophone on "Bird Song", entirety of second set and encore
Production
Produced by Grateful Dead
Produced for release by David Lemieux
Executive producer: Mark Pinkus
Associate producers: Doran Tyson, Ryan Wilson
Original recordings produced by John Cutler
Mixing: Jeffrey Norman
Consulting engineer: Rick Vargas
Mastering: David Glasser
File wrangling: Anna Frick
Tape research: Michael Wesley Johnson
Illustration: Jessica Dessner
Photography: Kraig Fox
Art direction, design: Steve Vance

References

Grateful Dead live albums
2014 live albums
Rhino Entertainment live albums